Harikela was an ancient empire located in the Bengal region of the Indian subcontinent. Originally, it was a independent township of ancient East Bengal, which had a continuous existence of about 500 years. The state of Harikal consisted of present-day Sylhet and Chittagong divisions of Bangladesh, as well as the Tripura state of India.

History 
two seventh century Chinese travellers mention a kingdom of Harikela. The kingdom was ruled by the Chandra dynasty during the 10th century CE. They were overthrown by the Varman Dynasty of Southeast Bengal, who were in turn overthrown by the Deva dynasty.

Geography 

For a time its capital was near Chittagong before being moved to Munshiganj by the Candras. Arab traders recognised Harikela (known as Harkand in Arabic) as the coastal regions of Bengal (near Chittagong) in the early period and included Sylhet in the later period reaching as far as the ancient Sundarbans.

Notes

References

External links
 

Ancient divisions in Bengal

Medieval India